Barilius modestus is a fish in genus Barilius of the family Cyprinidae.

References 

M
Fish described in 1872